Kingston and the Islands is a provincial electoral district in Ontario, Canada, that has been represented in the Legislative Assembly of Ontario since 1967.

It covers the city of Kingston, Ontario and the nearby areas, including the sparsely populated Frontenac Islands in the St. Lawrence River.

Demographics
 Average family income: $68,494 (2001)
 Median household income: $46,310
 Unemployment: 7.4%
 Language, Mother Tongue: English  84%, French 3%, Other 13%
 Religion: Protestant 44%, Catholic 33%, Orthodox Christian 1%, Other Christian 2%, Muslim 1%, Jewish 1%, Non Religious Affiliation 18%, Other 1%
 Visible Minority: Black 1%, Chinese 1%, South Asian 1%, Others 2%

Boundaries
The riding was created before the 1967 provincial election. Its initial area consisted of the townships of Amherst Island, Howe Island and Wolfe Island, the city of Kingston and the islands in the St. Lawrence River within the county of Frontenac. In 1986, it was changed slightly to include Kingston and the three major islands plus all the land south of Highway 401 within the township of Pittsburgh.

In 1996, the provincial government reduced the number of ridings in the province from 130 to 103. They also directed the new ridings to correspond to the boundaries of the existing federal ridings. At that time, the federal counterpart, Kingston and the Islands, existed with the same boundaries as the current provincial riding. After the 1999 election, minor changes to the riding were made along with the federal counterpart in 2003 and 2013.

Members of Provincial Parliament

Election results

2007 electoral reform referendum

References

External links
 Map of riding for 2018 election

Kingston, Ontario
Ontario provincial electoral districts